Bhimsen is a village in Kanpur district in the state of Uttar Pradesh, India.

Demographics
Bhimsen village has population of 7359 of which 3903 are males while 3456 are females as per Population Census 2011. Bhimsen village has higher literacy rate compared to Uttar Pradesh. In 2011, literacy rate of Bhimsen village was 72.65% compared to 67.68% of Uttar Pradesh. In Rampur Bhimsen Male literacy stands at 79.82% while female literacy rate was 64.41%.

Transport
It is well connected by rail and road. Bhimsen Junction railway station provides connections to Manikpur Sarhat, Kanpur and Jhansi.

Geography 
It has an average elevation of 125 meters (413 feet)

References

Cities and towns in Kanpur Nagar district